201 Squadron or 201st Squadron may refer to:

 201 Squadron (Israel), a unit of the Israeli Air Force
 Escuadrón 201, a unit of the World War II Mexican Expeditionary Air Force
 201 Squadron (Portugal), a unit of the Portuguese Air Force
 No. 201 Squadron RAF, a unit of the Royal Air Force
 201st Airlift Squadron, a unit of the United States District of Columbia Air National Guard
 VFA-201, a unit of the United States Naval Reserve